John Hays (22 July 1949 – 13 November 2020) was a British businessman, and the founder/CEO of Hays Travel, now the largest independent travel agency in the UK.

Career
Hays earned a degree in mathematics from the University of Oxford. He later earned an MBA from Manchester Business School. In 1980, Hays founded Hays Travel in the back of his mother's children's wear store in Seaham, Durham. Hays owned 56.42% and his wife Irene owned 43.58%.

Personal life
John Hays married Irene Lucas in 1997. She has chaired the company since his death. The couple had two children.

Death
John Hays died on 13 November 2020, aged 71, after collapsing at the company's Sunderland head office.

References

1949 births
2020 deaths
20th-century British businesspeople
21st-century British businesspeople
British company founders
Alumni of the University of Oxford
Alumni of the Manchester Business School
People from Sunderland
Businesspeople from Tyne and Wear